Aamir Khan is an Indian actor, filmmaker, and television personality. Khan first appeared on screen at the age of eight in a minor role in his uncle Nasir Hussain's film Yaadon Ki Baaraat (1973). In 1983, he acted in and worked as an assistant director on Paranoia, a short film directed by Aditya Bhattacharya, following which he assisted Hussain on two of his directorial venturesManzil Manzil (1984) and Zabardast (1985). As an adult, Khan's first acting project was a brief role in the 1984 experimental social drama Holi.

Khan's first leading role came opposite Juhi Chawla in the highly successful tragic romance Qayamat Se Qayamat Tak (1988). His performance in the film and in the thriller Raakh (1989) earned him a National Film Award – Special Mention. He went on to establish himself with roles in several lucrative films of the 1990s, including the romantic drama Dil (1990), the comedy-drama Hum Hain Rahi Pyar Ke (1993), and the romance Raja Hindustani (1996). He also played against type in the Deepa Mehta-directed Canadian-Indian co-production Earth (1998). In 1999, Khan launched a production company, Aamir Khan Productions, whose first release Lagaan (2001) was nominated for the Academy Award for Best Foreign Language Film, and earned him the National Film Award for Best Popular Film. Also in 2001, he starred alongside Saif Ali Khan and Akshaye Khanna in the acclaimed coming-of-age drama Dil Chahta Hai. Lagaan and Dil Chahta Hai are cited in the media as defining films of Hindi cinema. After a four-year hiatus, Khan portrayed the eponymous lead in Mangal Pandey: The Rising (2005), a period film that underperformed at the box office, after which he played leading roles in two top-grossing films of 2006Fanaa and Rang De Basanti.

Khan made his directorial debut with Taare Zameen Par in 2007, a drama on dyslexia starring Darsheel Safary, in which Khan also played a supporting role. The film proved to be a critical and commercial success, winning him the National Film Award for Best Film on Family Welfare. Khan played a man with anterograde amnesia in the 2008 thriller Ghajini, after which he portrayed an engineering student in the comedy-drama 3 Idiots (2009), and a reclusive artist in the drama Dhobi Ghat (2010), which he also produced. Further success came when he played the antagonist of the adventure film Dhoom 3 (2013) and starred as the titular alien in the -grossing satire PK (2014). In 2016, Khan played the father of two young female wrestlers in the sports biopic Dangal, which earned over  worldwide. Five of Khan's filmsGhajini, 3 Idiots, Dhoom 3, PK, and Dangal have held records for being the highest-grossing Indian film of all time. In addition to acting in films, Khan has developed and featured as the host of the television talk show Satyamev Jayate (2012–14).

Film

Television

Music video appearances

See also 
 Awards and nominations received by Aamir Khan

Footnotes 
The exchange rate in 1996 was 35.49 Indian rupees per 1 US dollar (US$).
Khan played the younger version of Tariq Khan's character in the film.
Khan played the younger version of Mahendra Sandhu's character in the film.
Khan played a character who portrays Chandrashekar Azad in a documentary featured in the film.
Khan played a character who impersonates another man in the film.
Khan performed dual roles in the film.

References

External links 
 
 Aamir Khan on Bollywood Hungama

Aamir Khan
Indian filmographies
Male actor filmographies
Director filmographies